Norris v. Ireland was a case decided by the European Court of Human Rights (ECHR) in 1988, in which David Norris successfully charged that Ireland's criminalisation of certain homosexual acts between consenting adult men was in breach of Article 8 of the European Convention on Human Rights (right to respect for private and family life).

Original case 

The original case in the Irish courts was Norris v. Attorney General, introduced in 1977 and decided by the Supreme Court of Ireland in 1983. Norris's Senior Counsel was fellow member of the Campaign for Homosexual Law Reform, Mary Robinson, who in 1990 would become the first female President of Ireland. The Irish courts ruled that Norris's right to privacy was not violated by the Offences against the Person Act 1861 (criminalising "buggery") and the Criminal Law Amendment Act 1885 (criminalising "gross indecency").

Case before the ECtHR 
Norris appealed the Irish court's decision to the ECtHR in 1983. The Court passed judgment in 1988, deciding in Norris's favour on grounds similar to those of its 1981 decision in Dudgeon v United Kingdom.

The laws impugned by the judgment were eventually repealed by the Criminal Law (Sexual Offences) Act, 1993.

See also

David Norris
Dudgeon v United Kingdom
LGBT rights in the Republic of Ireland
List of LGBT-related European Court of Human Rights cases

References
 
 

1988 in case law
1988 in Ireland
1988 in LGBT history
Article 8 of the European Convention on Human Rights
European Court of Human Rights cases decided by the Grand Chamber
European Court of Human Rights cases involving Ireland
European Court of Human Rights case law on LGBT rights
Republic of Ireland LGBT rights case law